Maudie Dunham (1902 in Doddinghurst, Essex - 1982) was a British actress.

Filmography
 The Beetle (1919)
 The Winning Goal (1920)
 The Ugly Duckling (1920)
 Love in the Wilderness (1920)
 The Night Riders (1920)
 A Temporary Gentleman (1920)
 All the Winners (1920)
 The Magistrate (1921)
 Mr. Pim Passes By (1921)
 Love Maggy (1921)
 Sinister Street (1922)
 What Money Can Buy (1928)

References

External links
 

1902 births
1982 deaths
British film actresses
People from the Borough of Brentwood
British actresses
20th-century British actresses